ZDF-Fernsehgarten (English: ZDF Television garden) is a German entertainment TV show broadcast live from the grounds of the ZDF broadcasting centre at Mainz. It is a seasonal live programme which airs only during the summer months with 16 to 21 episodes being produced. The show is presented by Andrea Kiewel as of 2009.

History 
The first ZDF Fernsehgarten was broadcast on 29 June 1986 and was hosted by Ilona Christen who had a trademark of wearing unusual spectacles and a yellow raincoat.

On 17 September 2006, Fernsehgarten celebrated its 20th anniversary. In the 2007 season of the ZDF Fernsehgarten was organised in collaboration with the magazine Yam! It was also the first time a school band competition was organised which was an integral part of the programme at this time.

On 8 July 2012 a performance by Roland Kaiser was disrupted. Also, two weeks later people were arrested at the show.

At the end of the 2013 summer season by popular demand of viewers it was decided to broadcast ZDF Fernsehgarten throughout the year, this included a new "Fernsehgarten on Tour". The show is rebranded depending upon the season.

Since May 2014 an audio description has been provided for the blind and partially sighted.

On 29 June 2014 the ZDF Fernsehgarten appeared in the Guinness Book of World Records as the longest running live open-air entertainment show. The programme has run continuously for 28 years. Total airtime to date is 49,507 minutes and 31 seconds and were broadcast live, equivalent to 34 days at a stretch.

ZDF Fernsehgarten on Tour 
As a result of the high popularity of ZDF Fernsehgarten, the programme went on tour for the spring and winter Sunday broadcasts of 2014 before returning to the open-air studio in Mainz for the summer. Three winter productions took place in Obertauern, Austria, with a fourth special in Kitzbühel featuring Hansi Hinterseer. Further to the tour in spring, the show was broadcast from R2 Hotel Rio Costa Calma in Fuerteventura. In the Autumn of 2014, the show went on tour for one episode live from Schloßberg in Graz and one episode from the Therme Merano spa hotel in Merano, South Tyrol.

In 2015 the show was broadcast on the winter tour for two episodes in Solda, South Tyrol, and St Anton am Arlberg, Tyrol. The show then returned to Mainz for two special episodes based on the 70's, 80's, 90's and pop music before going back on tour for three special episodes live from the beach of Bahia del Duque in Tenerife. In late 2015 Fernsehgarten was on tour in South Tirol and then Gran Canaria in May 2016.

External links 
 Official Website

References 

1986 German television series debuts
1990s German television series
2000s German television series
2010s German television series
German-language television shows
German television talk shows
German music television series
ZDF original programming